Burr is an unincorporated community south of  Humboldt, Saskatchewan.

It has an office for the rural municipality of Wolverine No. 340, a post office. A short distance north is a hall, and Saint Scholastica Roman Catholic Church (founded 1905).

According to the Encyclopedia of Saskatchewan, Victoria Cross recipient Raphael Louis Zengel lived in Burr from 1906 to 1914.

The "Burr Project" is a plan to extract potash from a large deposit in the area.

See also 
 List of communities in Saskatchewan

References 

Unincorporated communities in Saskatchewan
Wolverine No. 340, Saskatchewan